This is a list of English-language educational institutions in Quebec.

English-language school boards 
 Central Quebec School Board includes Quebec City, Mauricie, and Northern Quebec
 Eastern Shores School Board on Lower North Shore
 Eastern Townships School Board in Eastern Townships
 English Montreal School Board in central and eastern Montreal
 Lester B. Pearson School Board on West Island of Montreal
 New Frontiers School Board
 Riverside School Board on South Shore of Montreal
 Sir Wilfrid Laurier School Board in Laval and Laurentians
 Western Quebec School Board in Gatineau and Outaouais
 Commission scolaire du Littoral on the Lower North Shore

English-language private schools
Stanstead College
Bishop's College School
Lower Canada College
The Study
Selwyn House School
Kells Academy
Kuper Academy
College Prep International
North Star Academy Laval
West Island College
Greaves Adventist Academy

English-language colleges 
 TAV College in Montreal
 Heritage College in Gatineau
 Collège Universel - Campus Gatineau in Gatineau
 Dawson College in Montreal
 Marianopolis College in Montreal
 Vanier College in Montreal
 John Abbott College in Sainte-Anne-de-Bellevue
 Campus Lennoxville of the Champlain Regional College in Lennoxville
 Campus Saint-Lambert of the Champlain Regional College in Saint-Lambert
 Campus Saint-Lawrence of the Champlain Regional College in Sainte-Foy
 Cegep de la Gaspesie et des Iles in Gaspe
 Cégep de Sept-Îles in Sept-Îles, Quebec

English-language universities 
 McGill University in Montreal
 Concordia University in Montreal
 Bishop's University in Lennoxville

Post-secondary education 
 Canadian European Academy on West Island of Montreal

English-language education in Quebec
Lists of schools in Quebec